Bewars is a 2018 Telugu-language drama film, produced by Ponnala Chandu, Dr.M.S.Murthy, co-Aravind on Sri Sai Krupa Entertainments banner and written& directed by Ramesh Cheppala. It stars Rajendra Prasad, Sanjosh, Harshita in the lead roles and music composed by Sunil Kashyap.

Plot
The film begins on Satya Murthy (Rajendra Prasad) a small-time businessman, lives with his son Lucky (Sanjosh) & daughter Siri (Siri). He believes his son as frivolous but indeed Lucky's passion is on aeronautics. However, Satya Murthy aspires him to line up in UPSC on which daily squabble arises between them. The exclusive that endears Lucky is Siri who resolves the conflicts and immerses the house with joy. Meanwhile, Lucky falls for a charming girl Aaradhya (Harshitha) and Siri is engaged with a well-educated guy Karthik (Pratap) whom Satya Murthy prefers as best and scorns Lucky comparing with him. Here, as a flabbergast, they find Siri dead committing suicide which collapses both father & son. Nevertheless, Lucky realizes the suspicious nature of her death and seeks to break out the mystery. After a great struggle, he perceives the real culprit as Karthik whose profession is women trafficking. But unfortunately, he stuck into their clutches when Satya Murthy also realizes the truth and knocks out Karthik. Parallelly, Lucky escapes and creates it as suicide too. Thereafter, the father & son maintains silence. At last, Lucky marries Aaradhya and prepares for UPSC but Satya Murthy enrolls him in aeronautics. Finally, Satya Murthy affirms the parents who could not understand children are real feckless.

Cast
Rajendra Prasad as Satya Murthy
Sanjosh as Lucky
Harshita Panwar as Aaradhya
Pratap as Karthik
Siri as Siri
Kasi Viswanath
Vasu Inturi
Madhunandan
Gautham Raju

Soundtrack 

Music composed by Sunil Kashyap. Music released on ADITYA Music Company.

References

External links 
 

2010s Telugu-language films
Indian action drama films
Indian thriller drama films
2010s Indian films